Phebalium distans, commonly known as the Mt. Berryman phebalium, is a species of small tree that is endemic to south-east Queensland. It is more or less covered with silvery to rust-coloured scales and has warty branchlets, linear leaves and creamy yellow flowers in umbels on the ends of branchlets.

Description
It is more or less covered with silvery to rust coloured scales except for the upper surface of the leaves and petals. Flowering occurs from August to September.

Taxonomy and naming
Phebalium distans was first formally described in 2003 by Paul Irwin Forster in the journal Austrobaileya from specimens he collected in the Coalstoun Lakes National Park in 1990.

Distribution and habitat
Phebalium distans grows in or near vine thicket and occurs on Mt. Berryman, the Mt. Jones Plateau and Mt. Walla in south-east Queensland.

Conservation status
This phebalium is classified as "critically endangered" under the Australian Government Environment Protection and Biodiversity Conservation Act 1999 and as "endangered" under the Queensland Government Nature Conservation Act 1992. The main threats to the species include vegetation clearing, road maintenance, urban development and weed invasion.

References

distans
Flora of Queensland
Plants described in 2003
Taxa named by Paul Irwin Forster